The Solid Air Diamant LP is a German ultralight trike, designed and produced by Solid Air UL-Bau Franz of Hundheim, Rheinland-Pfalz. The aircraft is supplied as a complete ready-to-fly-aircraft.

Design and development
The Diamant LP was designed to comply with the German  microlight category. It features a cable-braced hang glider-style high-wing, weight-shift controls, a single-seat open cockpit with a cockpit fairing, tricycle landing gear with wheel pants and a single engine in pusher configuration.

The aircraft fuselage is made from composites, with its double surface aluminum-framed wing covered in Dacron sailcloth. Its  span Bautek Pico L wing is supported by a single tube-type kingpost and uses an "A" frame weight-shift control bar. The wing has a two-point mounting system which allows the nose of the aircraft to be raised when flaring for landing. The pilot's seat is adjustable for both leg length and back angle. The landing gear features both disc brakes and fibreglass suspension. The powerplant is a twin cylinder, air-cooled, two-stroke, dual-ignition  Hirth F-23 engine.

Specifications (Diamant LP with Bautek Pico L wing)

References

External links

2000s German sport aircraft
2000s German ultralight aircraft
Single-engined pusher aircraft
Ultralight trikes
Solid Air aircraft